Pashapole Union is a union parishad under Chaugachha Upazila of Jessore District in the division of Khulna, Bangladesh. It has an area of 10 square kilometres and a population of 18171.

References

Unions of Chaugachha Upazila
Unions of Jessore District
Unions of Khulna Division